Mark Eugene Russinovich (born December 22, 1966) is a Spanish-born American software engineer and author who serves as CTO of Microsoft Azure. He was a cofounder of software producers Winternals before it was acquired by Microsoft in 2006.

Early life and education
Russinovich was born in Salamanca, Spain and was raised in Birmingham, Alabama, United States, until he was 15, when he moved with his family to Pittsburgh, Pennsylvania. His father was a radiologist and his mother was a business administrator of his father's radiology practice in Pittsburgh. Russinovich is of Croatian descent.

He was introduced to computers when his friend's father got an Apple II in the 1970s. He was able to reverse engineer its ROM and write programs for it. At age 15, he bought himself his first computer, a Texas Instruments TI99/4A. About six months later his parents bought him an Apple II+ from his local high school when it upgraded the computer labs to Apple IIes. He also wrote magazine articles about Apple II.

In 1989, Russinovich earned his Bachelor of Science degree in computer engineering from Carnegie Mellon University, where he was a member of the Pi Kappa Alpha Beta Sigma chapter. The following year he received a Master of Science  degree in computer engineering from Rensselaer Polytechnic Institute. He later returned to Carnegie Mellon, where he received a Ph.D. in computer engineering in 1994 with thesis titled Application-transparent fault management. under the supervision of Zary Segall.

Career
From September 1994 through February 1996 he was a research associate with the University of Oregon's computer science department. From February through September 1996 he was a developer with NuMega Technologies, where he worked on performance monitoring software for Windows NT.

In 1996, he and Bryce Cogswell cofounded Winternals Software, where Russinovich served as Chief Software Architect, and the web site sysinternals.com, where Russinovich wrote and published dozens of popular Windows administration and diagnostic utilities including Autoruns, Filemon, Regmon, Process Explorer, TCPView, and RootkitRevealer among many others.

From September 1996 through September 1997, he worked as a consulting associate at OSR Open Systems Resources, Inc., a company based in Amherst, New Hampshire. From September 1997 through March 2000, he was a research staff member at IBM's Thomas J. Watson Research Center, researching operating system support for Web server acceleration and serving as an operating systems expert.

Russinovich joined Microsoft in 2006, when it acquired Winternals Software.

In his role as an author, he is a regular contributor to TechNet Magazine and Windows IT Pro magazine (previously called Windows NT Magazine) on the subject of the Architecture of Windows 2000 and was co-author of Inside Windows 2000 (third edition). Russinovich is the author of many tools used by Windows NT and Windows 2000 kernel-mode programmers, and of the NTFS file system driver for DOS.

Works
In 1996, Russinovich discovered that altering two values in the Windows Registry of the Workstation edition of Windows NT 4.0 would change the installation so it was recognized as a Windows NT Server and allow the installation of Microsoft BackOffice products which were licensed only for the Server edition. The registry key values were guarded by a worker thread to detect tampering, and later a program called NT Tune was released to kill the monitor thread and change the values.

Russinovich wrote LiveKD, a utility included with the book Inside Windows 2000. As of 2022, the utility is readily available to download.

In 2005, Russinovich discovered the Sony rootkit in Sony DRM products. Its function was to prevent users from copying their media.

In January 2006, Russinovich discovered a rootkit in Norton SystemWorks by Symantec. Symantec immediately removed the rootkit. He also analyzed the Windows Metafile vulnerability and concluded that it was not a deliberate backdoor. This possibility had been raised – although tentatively – by Steve Gibson after a cursory investigation of the nature of the exploit and its mechanism.

Russinovich's novels Zero Day (foreword by Howard Schmidt) and Trojan Horse (foreword by Kevin Mitnick) were published by Thomas Dunne Books on March 15, 2011 and September 4, 2012. Both are in a series of popular techno-thrillers, that have attracted praise from industry insiders such as Mikko Hyppönen and Daniel Suarez. A short story, "Operation Desolation" was published just before Trojan Horse and takes place 1 year after the events of Zero Day. Book 3, Rogue Code: A Novel (Jeff Aiken Series, May 2014) deals with vulnerabilities of the NYSE. It has a foreword by Haim Bodek, author of The Problem of HFT: Collected Writings on High Frequency Trading & Stock Market Structure Reform.

Works
Computer books
 
 
 
 
 
 
 Russinovich, Mark; Margosis, Aaron (October 17, 2016). Troubleshooting with the Windows Sysinternals Tools. Microsoft Press. ISBN 978-0-7356-8444-7.

Novels
 
 
 
 

Articles
 
 
 
 
 
 
 
 
 
 
 

Videos

References

External links
 
 Video interview with Mark in his office at Microsoft on TechNet Edge
 Mark's public event/session videos on Microsoft IT's Showtime! by TechNet
 Appearance on The Stack Exchange Podcast, Nov 11, 2011
 Original Article on Sony's rootkit
 Inside the WMF backdoor
 Windows Sysinternals Tools written by Mark Russinovich
 Interview with Scott Hanselman about Zero Day and Trojan Horse, 26 July 2012
 Mark on Security Now, 19 Sep 2012
 Mark on Windows Weekly, 20 Sep 2012

Microsoft Windows people
Living people
Microsoft technical fellows
Microsoft employees
Writers from Birmingham, Alabama
Carnegie Mellon University alumni
Rensselaer Polytechnic Institute alumni
Year of birth uncertain
American people of Croatian descent
Techno-thriller writers
American chief technology officers
Industry and corporate fellows
1966 births
People from Salamanca
Spanish emigrants to the United States